A penumbral lunar eclipse occurred on 28 November 2012, the second of two lunar eclipses in 2012.

Visibility 

A simulated view of the earth from the center of the moon at maximal eclipse

Map

Related eclipses

Eclipses of 2012 
 An annular solar eclipse on 20 May.
 A partial lunar eclipse on 4 June.
 A total solar eclipse on 13 November.
 A penumbral lunar eclipse on 28 November.

Lunar year (354 days) 

This eclipse is the one of four lunar eclipses in a short-lived series. The lunar year series repeats after 12 lunations or 354 days (Shifting back about 10 days in sequential years). Because of the date shift, the Earth's shadow will be about 11 degrees west in sequential events.

Half-Saros cycle
A lunar eclipse will be preceded and followed by solar eclipses by 9 years and 5.5 days (a half saros). This lunar eclipse is related to two total solar eclipses of Solar Saros 152.

See also 
List of lunar eclipses and List of 21st-century lunar eclipses
 :File:2012-11-28 Lunar Eclipse Sketch.gif Chart

References

External links
 
 Penumbral lunar eclipse on 28 November 2012
 NASA: Penumbral Lunar Eclipse of 28 November

2012-11
2012 in science